Abed Azrie or Abed Azrié (born 1945 in Aleppo) is a French-Syrian singer and composer, who performs Classical music in a variety of languages, including Arabic, English, French, German, Spanish, and other. He describes his works as not belonging to any particular music tradition. In his work he sets ancient and modern Arabic, Sumerian, and other West Asian texts to traditional instruments (such as the ney, kanun, darbuka, violin, flute and lute), and synthesizers.

He was born in Aleppo, and after living for a time in Beirut moved to Paris at the age of 22 where he studied Western classical music. While there he translated classical poetry, such as the Sumerian Epic of Gilgamesh, into French. He has stated that he prefers to live in the West, saying in a 2000 interview that he has an "inability to work in the Arab countries, in which the way people live is still conditioned by halal and haram. Here I can produce contemporary art, I can work in freedom, and there is 'motion' around what I produce: journalism, concerts, programme…Nobody tells me to write a song for a specific political occasion."

His music has been featured in the films Al Leja, directed by Ryad Chaia, Elia Suleiman's Chronicle of a Disappearance. and Florence Strauss's "Between Two Notes" 2006, as well as in Jan Visser's 1975 TV documentary De Droom (The Dream), based on drawings by and interviews with Palestinian refugee children and Palestinian resistance poetry.

Discography

 1990: Aromates
 1994: Epopée de Gilgamesh
 1996: Lapis Lazuli
 1999: Pour enfants seulement
 1999: Omar Khayyam
 2001: Venessia - sung in Venetian dialect.
 2006: Suerte Live
 2007: Chants d'amour et d'ivresse (Live A Radio France)
 2008: Mystique - Sufi poems
 2009: Évangile selon Jean oratorio in Arabic, 2CD
 2010: Satie En Orient with Ensemble Sarband
 2011: Epopée De Gilgamesh (New Recording 2011)

References

1945 births
Living people
20th-century Syrian male singers
People from Aleppo
Syrian emigrants to France
21st-century French male singers